This is a list of Hindu temples in the Indian state of Uttarakhand.

Lists of Hindu temples in India
Temples in Uttarakhand
Hindu temples in Uttarakhand